The Coachella Valley Public Cemetery is a cemetery in the Coachella Valley of California. It is near Indio and La Quinta.


Notable interments
Among those buried here are:

 Frank Bogert (1910–2009), Westerns movie star and Mayor of Palm Springs
 Frank Capra (1897–1991), film director
 Jacqueline Cochran (1906–1980), aviator
 Al McCandless (1927–2017), politician
 Benjamin Montoya (1935–2015), U.S. Navy rear admiral
 Alan O'Day (1940–2013), singer-songwriter
 Tommy Shepard (1923–1993), trombonist 
 John Van Druten (1901–1957), playwright and theatre director
 Stan Wrightsman (1910–1975), jazz pianist

See also

 Forest Lawn Cemetery (Cathedral City)
 Desert Memorial Park
 List of cemeteries in California
 List of cemeteries in Riverside County, California

References

External links
 
 Coachella Valley Cemetery USGS Indio Quad, California, Topographic Map at TopoZone

Cemeteries in Riverside County, California
 01
Coachella Valley
Indio, California